Louis Destouches may refer to:

Louis-Camus Destouches
Louis-Ferdinand Destouches